Eugene Cook (April 12, 1904 – April 14, 1967) was an American jurist who served as Attorney General of Georgia from 1945 to 1965, and as an associate justice of the Supreme Court of Georgia from 1965 to 1967.

Born in Wrightsville, Georgia, Cook attended the public schools and received his undergraduate degree from Mercer University, followed by a law degree from Mercer University Law School in 1927.

He was the Attorney General of Georgia from 1945 to 1965, and a justice of the Georgia Supreme Court. He believed the NAACP was a communist organization.

Despondent in the months following the death of his wife, Cook died of a self-inflicted gunshot wound while still serving on the court.

References

1904 births
1967 deaths
People from Atlanta
Georgia (U.S. state) Attorneys General
Justices of the Supreme Court of Georgia (U.S. state)
Suicides by firearm in Georgia (U.S. state)
Mercer University alumni
20th-century American judges
1967 suicides